Lady Godiva is a 2008 British romantic comedy film written and directed by Vicky Jewson. The film, starring Phoebe Thomas, Matthew Chambers, and Natalie Walter, was shot in 2006 but went unreleased for two years. Based on the historic tale of Lady Godiva, it was set in modern-day Oxford.

Plot
Jemima Honey, a teacher, needs to raise funds for her local creative arts centre. To do so, she accepts the challenge of businessmen and love interest Michael Bartle to ride through the streets of Oxford nude.

Cast
 Phoebe Thomas as Jemima Honey/Lady Godiva
 Matthew Chambers as Michael Bartle
 Natalie Walter as Susie
 James Wilby as Earl of Mercia, Leofric
 Isabelle Amyes as Mrs. Bartle
 Lara Cazalet as Esclairmonde
 Freddie Stroma as Matt
 Julia Verdin as Veronica
 Simon Williams as Rupert

Reception
The film was panned by critics, with criticism mostly focusing on its script and direction. Rob Daniel of Sky Movies wrote that 'all involved should be sent straight to the glue factory', Ellen E Jones of Total Film advised that viewers 'Avoid like you would a naked nutter bouncing down the street', Hannah Forbes Black of Film4 described it as 'relentlessly awful to the point of unintentional comedy, this Godiva would do well to get off the horse and put her clothes back on' and Total Film highlighted 'clunky direction' and a 'hokey script'.

References

External links
 
 

Lady Godiva
2008 films
2000s English-language films
2008 romantic comedy films
British romantic comedy films
Films set in Oxford
Films shot in France
Films shot in Oxfordshire
2000s British films